Guyniidae is a family of corals belonging to the order Scleractinia (hard corals).

Genera:
 Bistylia Tenison-Woods, 1878
 Cyathosmilia Tenison-Woods, 1878
 Guynia Duncan, 1873
 Onchotrochus Duncan, 1869
 Pourtalocyathus Cairns, 1979

References

Scleractinia
Cnidarian families